Dalton High School is a public high school located in Dalton, Georgia, United States. It  is one of three high schools operated by Dalton Public Schools.

In 2003 about 46% of the students were Hispanic or Latino, reflecting immigration from Mexico into Dalton that began in the 1990s. In 2012 Hispanics and Latinos still maintained a plurality.

Notable alumni 

 Jim Arnold, punter in the National Football League
 Charlie Bethel, Georgia state Supreme Court justice
 Mitchell Boggs, professional Major League Baseball player
 Jahmyr Gibbs, football running back
 William Ragsdale Cannon, Bishop in the United Methodist Church
 Susan P. Coppedge, United States Ambassador-at-Large to Monitor and Combat Trafficking in Persons
 Bill Mayo, All-American football player
 Deborah Norville, television personality

References

Schools in Whitfield County, Georgia
Public high schools in Georgia (U.S. state)